Adam Khan Dukhaniye is a Pollywood film of 1971. It stars Badar Munir and Yasmeen Khan in the lead roles.

Cast
Badar Munir
Yasmin Khan

References

1971 films
Pakistani drama films
Pashto-language films
Pakistani black-and-white films